The Immaculate Conception is a dogma of the Catholic Church that states that the Virgin Mary was free of original sin from the moment of her conception.

Immaculate may also refer to:
Immaculate (album), a 2001 album by Mac Mall, or the title track
The Immaculate, a 2009 album by Mac
Immaculate (1950 film), a Mexican drama film by Julio Bracho
Immaculate (upcoming film), an upcoming American horror film
"Immaculate", a 2021 single by Gabi DeMartino from her 2022 album Paintings of Me
"Immaculate", a song by Years & Years from their 2022 album Night Call

See also
Immaculata (disambiguation)
Immacolata (disambiguation)